Jan Jeřábek (born 1 September 1992) is a Czech football forward currently playing for Vlašim.

References

External links
 
 
 Profile at Vlašim website 

1992 births
Living people
Footballers from Prague
Czech footballers
AC Sparta Prague players
FC Sellier & Bellot Vlašim players
Association football forwards